Hamilton Fish III (born Hamilton Stuyvesant Fish and also known as Hamilton Fish Jr.; December 7, 1888 – January 18, 1991) was an American soldier and politician from New York State. Born into a family long active in the state, he served in the United States House of Representatives from 1920 to 1945 and during that time was a prominent opponent of United States intervention in foreign affairs and was a critic of President Franklin D. Roosevelt. When Fish celebrated his 102nd birthday in 1990, he was the oldest living American who had served in Congress. During his tenure in Congress, accusations of collusion with Nazis came to light. These accusations were later confirmed by the discovery of Nazi documents seized after the end of World War II. Later, his ties to George Sylvester Viereck, a top Nazi spy working in the US to spread pro-Hitler and anti-Semitic propaganda, were confirmed by the discovery of correspondence between Viereck and US Senator Ernest Lundeen.

Family and early life

Hamilton Stuyvesant Fish was born in Garrison, New York, to the former Republican U.S. Representative Hamilton Fish II and the former Emily Mann. His paternal grandfather, Hamilton Fish, was United States Secretary of State under the Republican President Ulysses S. Grant. The father of the first Hamilton Fish, Nicholas Fish (born 1758), was an officer in the Continental Army and was later appointed adjutant general of New York by Governor George Clinton.

The wife of Nicholas Fish was Elizabeth Stuyvesant, a descendant of Peter Stuyvesant, who was the Dutch colonial governor of New York. Through his mother, Emily Mann, Hamilton Fish III was also a descendant of Thomas Hooker, who settled Hartford, Connecticut, in 1636. Fish's uncle Elias Mann was a judge and three-term mayor of Troy, New York.

Fish's great-grandmother, Susan Livingston, married Count Julian Ursyn Niemcewicz in 1800 after the death of her husband, John Kean (who had been a delegate to the Continental Congress from South Carolina.) A soldier and statesman, Niemcewicz was credited with writing the Polish Constitution of 1791. John Kean and Susan Livingston's great-grandson, and thus a relative of Fish, was Thomas Kean, who was elected governor of New Jersey in 1982.

A cousin of Hamilton Fish III (also named Hamilton Fish) was a sergeant in Company L of Theodore Roosevelt's "Rough Riders", and the first American soldier killed in action during the Spanish–American War. Hamilton Fish II had his ten-year-old son's name legally changed from Hamilton Stuyvesant Fish to just Hamilton Fish to honor his fallen cousin (he and Hamilton Fish III never met).

Fish was married in 1921 to Grace Chapin Rogers (1885–1960), daughter of onetime Brooklyn Mayor Alfred C. Chapin (1848–1936). Their son, Hamilton Fish IV, was a thirteen-term U.S. Representative from New York, holding office from 1969 to 1995. The Fishes' daughter Lillian Veronica Fish married David Whitmire Hearst, son of William Randolph Hearst.

Education
During his childhood, Fish attended Chateau de Lancy, a Swiss school near Geneva, which his father also attended in 1860; there, the younger Fish learned French and played soccer. He spent summers with his family in Bavaria. He began his U.S. boarding school education at Fay School in Southborough, Massachusetts, and he later attended St. Mark's School, a preparatory school also in Southborough. Fish later described himself as a "B student" but successful in several different sports.

Graduating from St. Mark's in 1906, Fish went on to attend Harvard College, class of 1910. There, he played on Harvard's football team as a tackle and was a member of the Porcellian Club. Standing  and weighing , "Ham" Fish was highly successful as a football player; he was twice an All-America and in 1954 was inducted into the College Football Hall of Fame. He was the only Harvard man on Yale graduate Walter Camp's "All time" "All America" team. After graduating from Harvard, Fish continued his involvement in football. He donated $5000 for several awards to Harvard football players; and organized the Harvard Law School football team, which played exhibition games with other colleges around the country.

In 1909, at 20, Fish graduated early from Harvard with a cum laude degree in history and government. He declined an offer to teach history at Harvard and instead attended Harvard Law School. He left law school before graduating, and took a job in a New York City insurance office.

Fish was a Progressive member of the New York State Assembly (Putnam Co.) in 1914, 1915 and 1916.

Military service

Prior to the United States entering the First World War, Fish was captain of Company K, 15th New York Infantry. When the 15th was mobilized for Federal service, Fish accepted an offer from Col. William Hayward to retain his position in the 369th Infantry (as the 15th New York was re-designated following mobilization). The 369th was a unit of African American enlisted men with white officers (and a few African American officers at the start of the war) which came to be known as the "Harlem Hellfighters." The 369th Infantry was assigned to the 93d Division.

The summer after President Wilson's declaration of war against Germany (in April 1917), Fish and about two thousand soldiers began training at Camp Whitman (in New York). In October 1917, the unit was ordered to Camp Wadsworth (in South Carolina) for further training. In November 1917, the regiment boarded the USS Pocahontas, destined for France, although shortly thereafter the ship returned to shore due to engine problems. After another aborted departure, the ship left on December 13, 1917. Despite colliding with another ship and not having a destroyer escort to protect against German submarines, the regiment reached France. (Fish complained to Assistant Secretary of the Navy Franklin D. Roosevelt about the lack of an escort.)

Fish and his unit landed in Brest, France on December 26; the 369th Infantry was placed under the control of the French army by U.S. General John J. Pershing. Altogether, the 369th Infantry spent 191 days on the front lines, which was the longest of any American regiment. It was also the first Allied regiment to reach the Rhine River. Fish received the Silver Star and the French War Cross 1914–1918. In addition, Fish and his sister Janet, who had been a nurse near the front lines, were both later inducted into the French Legion of Honor for their wartime service.

Fish was promoted to major on March 13, 1919, and returned to the United States on April 25 of the same year. He was discharged from the Army on May 14, 1919. He continued as a member of the Officers' Reserve Corps until the 1940s, and attained the rank of colonel.

Service in the U.S. Congress

First elected to fill the vacancy caused by Edmund Platt's resignation, Fish was a member of the US House of Representatives from November 2, 1920, to January 3, 1945, having been defeated for re-election in 1944. In nearly 25 years as a US Representative, Fish would become known as a strong anticommunist and an acerbic critic of Franklin Roosevelt, which raised his profile and made him an ally of the anti-Roosevelt members of Congress. Despite this, in a decision he would later regret, Fish privately supported Roosevelt against Republican nominee Herbert Hoover in the election of 1932, urging his wife to cast her vote for Fish’s future arch-nemesis.

He was opposed to Roosevelt's New Deal. A non-interventionist until after the attack on Pearl Harbor, Fish was among those in the U.S. Congress who went on record protesting the treatment of Jews in Adolf Hitler's Germany. On December 8, 1941, he made the first speech in Congress asking for a declaration of war against Japan, but later said he never would have asked for it had he been aware of what Roosevelt did to provoke Japan into the attack. His unapologetic opposition to the New Deal provoked Roosevelt into including him with two other Capitol Hill opponents in a rollicking taunt that became a staple of Roosevelt's 1940 re-election campaign: "Martin, Barton and Fish." Finally, in part under the influence of New York Governor Thomas Dewey, Fish's congressional career ended when he won the Republican Party primary in his district but lost the general election in 1944.

Upon his 1944 defeat, after 26 years in Congress, Fish stated, "I particularly wanted to be elected to serve as chairman of the rules committee to stop the march toward communism and totalitarianism in America. I have no regrets whatever, as I waged the strongest possible fight that I knew how."

In 1936 Fish succeeded his father as a hereditary member of the New York Society of the Cincinnati.

Unknown Soldier of World War I and Tomb of the Unknowns
On December 21, 1920, Fish introduced Resolution 67 of the 66th Congress, which provided for the return to the United States the remains of an unknown American soldier killed in France during World War I and for interment of his remains in a hallowed tomb to be constructed outside the Memorial Amphitheater in Arlington National Cemetery in Arlington, Virginia, across the Potomac River from the nation's capital. Congress approved the resolution on March 4, 1921. On October 23, 1921, at Châlons-sur-Marne, France, about 90 miles from Paris, remains of an unknown soldier were selected from among four caskets containing remains of unknown American soldiers killed in France. The selected remains were returned to the United States and interred at the tomb site in Arlington on November 11, 1921, in solemn ceremony following a state funeral procession from the US Capitol building, where the World War I Unknown had lain in state. The tomb, completed in 1937, came to be known as the Tomb of the Unknowns (Soldiers), which is today guarded around the clock daily by elite sentries of the US Army's historic ceremonial but combat-ready 3rd Infantry Regiment—"The Old Guard." The tomb and the unknown soldiers of three US wars interred there today is thought to be the most hallowed military site in the United States and may well be Fish's greatest legacy to the nation.

Lodge–Fish Resolution
In June 1922, he introduced the Lodge–Fish Resolution to illustrate American support for the British policy in Palestine per the 1917 Balfour Declaration.

Fish Committee
Hamilton Fish was a fervent anticommunist; in a 1931 article, he described communism as "the most important, the most vital, the most far-reaching, and the most dangerous issue in the world" and believed that there was extensive communist influence in the United States.

On May 5, 1930, he introduced House Resolution 180, which proposed to establish a committee to investigate communist activities in the United States; the resulting committee, commonly known as the Fish Committee, undertook extensive investigations of people and organizations suspected of being involved with or supporting communist activities in the United States. Among the committee's targets were the American Civil Liberties Union and Communist Party presidential candidate William Z. Foster. The committee recommended granting the US Department of Justice more authority to investigate communists and the strengthening of immigration and deportation laws to keep communists out of the United States.

In 1933, Fish was on a committee that sponsored the publication in the United States of a translation of a Nazi book called Communism in Germany, by Adolf Ehrt. In the prefatory note, the committee said it they did not publish it as a defense of anti-Semitism or the Nazi regime but because it believed that the struggle between Nazis and communists in Germany provided a lesson about using "effective measures" to defend against communism. The book claimed that Jews were responsible for communism in Germany and that only Adolf Hitler could stop it. Under pressure from American Jewish and liberal groups, Fish and the other committee members disavowed the book. Fish also distributed the long-debunked Protocols of the Elders of Zion from his congressional office.

Isolationism and Nazi advocacy
Fish was touted by the Germans as a friendly American ally. Time magazine once termed him "the Nation's No. 1 isolationist."

On August 14, 1939, Fish, president of the US delegation to the Interparliamentary Union Congress conference in Oslo, Norway, met with Joachim Ribbentrop. Fish flew to Oslo in Ribbentrop's private plane. Fish, a staunch opponent of Roosevelt, advocated better relations with Nazi Germany and hoped to solve the "Danzig question" during the conference in Norway. "Stepping out of Joachim von Ribbentrop's plane in 1939, Fish opined that Germany's claims were 'just. Fish and his faction of the Republican Party received material support from the Germans to promote isolationism and non-interventionism in the United States, particularly at the 1940 Republican National Convention. Fish spoke at a pro-Nazi rally held at Madison Square Garden in 1938.

In 1940, just after the presidential election, Fish sent a telegram to Roosevelt which read: "Congratulations. I pledge my support for national defense ... and to keep America out of foreign wars."

In 1941, a judiciary panel investigating the activities of Nazi agents in the US, sent officers to the Washington headquarters of an anti-British organization, the Islands for War Debts Committee, to seize eight bags of franked congressional mail containing speeches by isolationist members of Congress. George Hill, Fish's chief of staff, had the mail taken to Fish's office storeroom just prior to their arrival.

A grand jury was convened and summoned Hill to explain why he had been so solicitous about the Islands for War Debts Committee's mail and his close association with George Sylvester Viereck, a Nazi propaganda agent. (Viereck would later be convicted of violating the Foreign Agents Registration Act and for having subsidized the Islands for War Debts Committee.) Hill said that he had not sent for the mail and did not know Viereck. The jury promptly indicted Hill for perjury.

Shortly after the indictment, Fish defended Hill claiming, "George Hill is 100% O.K., and I'll back George Hill to the limit on anything." During the trial, Hill had explained that Viereck visited Capitol Hill in 1940 and arranged for wholesale distribution of congressional speeches attacking the administration's foreign policy. After hearing that a jury had reached its verdict and anticipating a conviction, Fish issued a statement: "I am very sorry to learn that George Hill, a disabled, decorated veteran of the World War and a clerk in my office, has been convicted of perjury ... Mr. Hill is of English ancestry ... He had an obsession against our involvement in war." Twenty hours later, the jury convicted Hill.

In a speech to the House of Representatives less than 24 hours after Pearl Harbor, Fish would declare:

“Now that we are to fight, let us to in with our heads and chins up the American way, and let us serve notice upon the world that this is not only a way against aggression and in defense of our own territories, but a war for freedom and democracy all over the world, and that we will not stop until victory is won. […] I appeal to all American citizens, particularly to members of my own party, and to noninterventionists, to put aside personal views and partisanship, and unite behind the President, our commander-in-chief, in assuring victory to the armed forces of the United States. […]Our country! In her intercourse with foreign nations may she always be right, but right or wrong, our country!”

However, in his autobiography, Fish would describe himself as “ashamed of my remarks.”

Less than two weeks before the 1942 midterm congressional election, columnist Drew Pearson's nationally syndicated column (Washington Merry-Go-Round) described in detail how in 1939, Fish had received over $3,100 in cash from a source with German ties.

Civil rights
Fish continued to argue for civil rights of African Americans, particularly in the military. Three times (1922, 1937, and 1940), Fish joined with other Republicans and northern Democrats to pass anti-lynching bills. Each time, the bills passed the House, but Southern Democrats in the Senate blocked their passage and prevented them from becoming law.

In 1940, he succeeded in adding an amendment to the Military Appropriations Bill of 1941. The law included funding for increased manpower, equipment, and training as the United States prepared for possible entry into World War II. Fish's amendment banned racial discrimination in the selection and training of military personnel and was later seen as an important step leading to desegregation of the military.

Roosevelt articulated the Four Freedoms in his 1941 State of the Union speech. In 1944, Fish recalled his own World War I experiences and Roosevelt's Four Freedoms remarks in advocating for equal treatment of African Americans in the military: "Fourteen millions of loyal Americans have the right to expect that in a war for the advancement of the 'Four Freedoms' their sons be given the same right as any other American to train, to serve, and to fight in combat units in defense of the United States in this greatest war in its history."

Britain's campaign to defeat Fish
The British Security Coordination (BSC) focused a great deal of effort attempting to influence US Representatives through front groups, campaigning, and agents of influence. In 1940, BSC agents ran the Nonpartisan Committee to Defeat Hamilton Fish to "put the fear of God into every isolationist senator and congressman." The committee raised substantial sums of money for Fish's opponent, co-ordinated several media attacks, created false charges of wrongdoing just before elections, and helped to distribute books that charged Fish with disloyalty. The committee as much as possible tried to make attacks on Fish appear to originate from his district, but historical documents indicate that most attacks originated outside of his district. Fish survived the attack in 1940 but won his election with less than half the margin of victory that he had earned two years earlier.

Wartime elections
In the 1942 election, Fish, like other former isolationists, was considered vulnerable. The Orange and Putnam district, which Fish represented, had begun to turn against him. Polls predicted, incorrectly, that Fish would not even win the Republican primary. For the first time in his 22 years of political campaigning, he opened campaign headquarters. Soon thereafter, he was repudiated by the popular Republican gubernatorial candidate, Thomas Dewey. However, the November 1942 election occurred when voters were impatient for the battlefield victories that would later come, and Fish defeated his Democratic opponent by 4,000 votes.

However, reapportionment, which took effect in 1944, fragmented what had been his 26th District. That year, he ran in the 29th District, which no longer included his home county of Putnam but included one county (Orange) from his previous district and three new counties. 
Augustus W. Bennet defeated Fish by approximately 5,000 votes. As Time magazine reported, "In New York, to the nation's delight, down went rabid anti-Roosevelt isolationist Hamilton Fish, after 24 years in Congress. His successor: liberal Augustus W. Bennet, Newburgh lawyer."

About his exit from Congress, Fish said in his election-night concession speech that "my defeat should be largely credited to Communistic and Red forces from New York City backed by a large slush fund probably exceeding $250,000." In a farewell speech before the house on December 11, 1944, he stated, "It took most of the New Deal Administration, half of Moscow, $400,000, and Governor Dewey to defeat me."

Embittered by his defeat, Fish promptly sued Robert F. Cutler, the executive secretary of the group Good Government Committee for libel, seeking $250,000 in damages for advertisements depicting Fish as a Nazi sympathizer. The ads also depicted Fish associating with the "American Führer," Fritz Kuhn. He would later discontinue the lawsuit without a settlement.

Later life
On December 8, 1941, Fish volunteered for Army service, "preferably with colored troops," to avenge the attack on Pearl Harbor. At age 53, he did not have an opportunity to volunteer, and continued to serve in Congress.

Fish was one of the witnesses who appeared in the 1981 Warren Beatty film Reds, which depicts the life of journalist John Reed and his experiences during Russia's 1917 October Revolution, which led to the creation of a communist state in Russia and the Soviet Union. As part of producing the film, the crew interviewed in the 1970s several individuals who had witnessed the events of 1917. The interviews were used throughout the film to describe places and events and to bridge transitions between the scenes.

In his autobiography, Fish would accuse the United Nations of being a means for Franklin Roosevelt to "become president of the entire world." In addition, Fish would express support for NATO, United States invasions of Panama and Grenada, and the 1990 Gulf War, while criticizing the Vietnam War. Harshly critical of American support for France against Southeast Asian independence movements, Fish would describe John Foster Dulles as the “worst Secretary of State in American history.”  An epilogue to the memoir notes that Fish’s third of four wives filed for divorce soon after Christmas of 1984, when the 96 year old former Representative had refused to buy his wife gifts, in addition to attempting to house poultry on her property.

Death and burial
Fish died in Cold Spring, New York, on January 18, 1991. He was buried at Saint Philip's Church Cemetery in Garrison, New York.

Ancestors and descendants
Although he was the third Hamilton Fish in direct line in his family, like his father and his son, he was known as Hamilton Fish Jr. during his time in Congress. His grandson has also been known as Hamilton Fish III, and was publisher of the liberal magazine The Nation before making his own unsuccessful run for Congress as "Hamilton Fish Jr." in 1994. This grandson is also referred to as Hamilton Fish V. Hamilton Fish III married his fourth and last wife, Lydia Ambrogio Fish on September 9, 1988, and they remained married until his death. She died in Port Jervis on January 12, 2015.

Works

Books
 George Washington in the Highlands, or Some Unwritten History. Newburgh, NY: Newburgh News (1932).
 The Red Plotters. New York: Domestic and Foreign Affairs Publishers (1947).
 The Challenge of World Communism. Milwaukee: Bruce Publishing Company (1946).
 FDR: The Other Side of the Coin: How We Were Tricked Into World War II. New York: Vantage Press (1976). .
 Lafayette in America During and After the Revolutionary War and Other Essays on Franco-American Relations. New York: Vantage Press (1976). .
 New York State: The Battleground of the Revolutionary War. New York: Vantage Press (1976). .
 Tragic Deception: FDR and America's Involvement in World War II. Preface by the publisher. Old Greenwich, Conn.: Devin-Adair (1983). .
 Hamilton Fish: Memoir of an American Patriot. Chicago: Regnery Publishing (1991). .

Reports
 Participation in the Preparatory Commission to Consider Questions of Reduction and Limitation of Armaments (To Accompany H. J. Res. 352) (Feb. 12, 1927).

Public addresses
 "The Republican Party Keeps Faith With Lincoln." (Feb. 13, 1928). Delivered at the Lincoln Club in St. Paul, Minnesota.

Further reading
 Fish, Stuyvesant (1929). Ancestors of Hamilton Fish and Julia Ursin Niemcewicz Kean, His Wife. New York: The Evening Post.

See also
 List of members of the American Legion
 List of centenarians (politicians and civil servants)

References

External links

Interview for The Great Depression, 1990. 
Washington University Libraries, Film and Media Archive, Henry Hampton Collection.
 
 
 
 
 
 

|-

1888 births
1991 deaths
20th-century American politicians
Activists for African-American civil rights
All-American college football players
American anti-war activists
American centenarians
American collaborators with Nazi Germany
American anti-communists
American football tackles
United States Army personnel of World War I
College Football Hall of Fame inductees
Fay School alumni
Hamilton III
Founders of lineage societies
Harvard College alumni
Harvard Crimson football players
Recipients of the Legion of Honour
Republican Party members of the New York State Assembly
Men centenarians
Military personnel from New York (state)
New York (state) Progressives (1912)
Non-interventionism
Old Right (United States)
Politicians from Putnam County, New York
Recipients of the Croix de Guerre 1914–1918 (France)
Recipients of the Silver Star
Republican Party members of the United States House of Representatives from New York (state)
St. Mark's School (Massachusetts) alumni
United States Army Command and General Staff College alumni
United States Army officers